Chini-Bagh was the Kashgar, Xinjiang residence of George Macartney, Britain's consul-general and his wife, Lady Catherine Macartney, for 28 years. Over the years, Chini-Bagh saw a variety of Central Asian explorers, including Aurel Stein, Father Hendricks, Albert von Le Coq, Sven Hedin, A.R.B. Shuttleworth and two of Count Otani's Central Asian archaeologists/spies, Eizaburo Nomura and Zuicho Tachibana.

The phrase "Chini-Bagh" means Chinese Garden in the Uyghur language. Although the house still stands, its famed gardens were later destroyed to make room for the Chini Bagh hotel.

References

Houses in China
Buildings and structures in Xinjiang
History of Xinjiang